The hackle is a clipped plume or short spray of coloured feathers that is attached to a military headdress, with different colours being associated with particular regiments.

In the British Army and the armies of some Commonwealth countries, the hackle is worn by some infantry regiments, especially those designated as fusilier regiments and those with Scottish and Northern Irish origins.

The modern hackle has its origins in a much longer plume, originally referred to by its Scots name, heckle, which was commonly attached to the feather bonnet worn by Highland regiments (now usually only worn by drummers, pipers and bandsmen). The smaller version originated in a regimental emblem adopted by the 42nd Royal Highland Regiment, to be worn in the sun helmet issued in hot-weather postings from the 1870s.

British Army

Hackle colours in British fusilier regiments

Modern fusiliers

In the modern British Army, there is a single regiment of fusiliers, plus a battalion of a large regiment. Hackle colours are:

 Royal Regiment of Fusiliers: Red over white 
 Royal Highland Fusiliers (a battalion of the Royal Regiment of Scotland): White
Other ranks of the Royal Welsh, the regiment that was formed by the amalgamation of the Royal Welch Fusiliers and Royal Regiment of Wales, continue to wear the white hackle of the Royal Welch Fusiliers.

Historic fusilier regiments
There were several other fusilier regiments which have been amalgamated and no longer exist. The hackle colours worn were as follows:

 Lancashire Fusiliers: Primrose yellow
 Royal Fusiliers (City of London Regiment): White
 Royal Inniskilling Fusiliers: Grey
 Royal Irish Fusiliers: Green
 Royal Northumberland Fusiliers: Red over white
 Royal Scots Fusiliers: White
 Royal Warwickshire Fusiliers: Blue over old gold (orange)
 Royal Welch Fusiliers: White
 Royal Munster Fusiliers: White over green
 Royal Dublin Fusiliers: Green over blue

Non-fusilier regiments

Non-fusilier regiments which wear the hackle are:

 Irish Guards (pipers on caubeen only): St Patrick's blue
 Liverpool Scottish (now a platoon of A (Ladysmith) Company, 4th Bn Duke of Lancaster's Regiment): Royal blue
 Liverpool Irish (now A Troop of 208 Battery, 103rd Regiment Royal Artillery): Blue over red
 London Irish Rifles (now D (London Irish Rifles) Company, London Regiment): Green [Pipers wear St Patrick's blue]
 Royal Irish Regiment (as the direct descendant of two regiments of fusiliers): Green
 Royal Scots Dragoon Guards (on pipers' feather bonnet in Full Dress, pipers' / drummers' glengarry /atholl bonnet in No.1 and No.2 dress): White
 Royal Welsh (Other Ranks only): White
 Scots Guards (pipers on feather bonnet only): Blue over red
 The Queen's University Officers' Training Corps: St Patrick's Blue (A Coy Caubeen Only)
 Royal Air Force (pipe band only): Blue

Royal Regiment of Scotland
Following the amalgamation of the regiments of the Scottish Division to form The Royal Regiment of Scotland on 28 March 2006, the following hackles are being worn by the regiment's constituent battalions:

 Royal Scots Borderers (1 SCOTS): Black
 Royal Highland Fusiliers (2 SCOTS): White
 Black Watch (3 SCOTS): Red
 The Highlanders (4 SCOTS): Blue
 Argyll and Sutherland Highlanders (5 SCOTS): Green
 52nd Lowland Volunteers (6 SCOTS): Grey
 51st Highland Volunteers (7 SCOTS): Purple

Whilst the white hackle of 2 SCOTS, red hackle of 3 SCOTS and blue hackle of 4 SCOTS have a known ancestry, the origin of 1 SCOTS black hackle and 5 SCOTS green hackle are not clear and have no apparent precedent. It may be that the black hackle of 1 SCOTS simulates the black-cock tail feathers originally worn in the 1904 pattern Kilmarnock Bonnet and latterly in the regimental Glengarry Cap by the Royal Scots and King's Own Scottish Borderers, who merged in August 2006 to form 1 SCOTS. Alternatively, it may be a sympathetic gesture to a former Lowland regiment, the Cameronians (Scottish Rifles), who went into 'suspended animation' in 1968 (and later disbanded), who wore a black hackle in their rifle green dress Balmoral. The adoption of the green hackle now being worn by the Argylls battalion (5 SCOTS) is no doubt a continuation of that regiment's association with the colour green, most prominent in the hue of their regimental kilts and stripes on their regimental association ties. (It is, however, worthy of note that in the 19th Century, all line regiments of the British Army used to designate their "light company" with a green hackle.) The Regimental Band of the Royal Regiment of Scotland does not wear the hackle. However, the Highland Band of the Royal Regiment of Scotland (Territorial Army) continues to wear the red hackle with the Tam o' Shanter. Tradition holds that the black hackle originated as a Scottish tradition of wearing a black feather in your hat to signify you have an ongoing quarrel with someone.

Other regiments
Former non-fusilier regiments, now amalgamated, which also wore the hackle were:

 40 (Ulster) Regiment, Royal Corps of Signals: Navy blue, sky blue and green.
 Argyll and Sutherland Highlanders: (feather bonnet only - drummers and drum major): White
 Argyll and Sutherland Highlanders: (Pipers only) Black cock feather
 Black Watch: Red
 The Cameronians (Scottish Rifles): Black
 Gordon Highlanders: Feather bonnet only - Drummers and drum major: White, Bandsmen: Red and white
 Gordon Highlanders: (Pipers only) black cock feather
 Highland Light Infantry: White over red
 The Highlanders (Seaforth, Gordons and Camerons): Royal blue
 The Highlanders (Seaforth, Gordons and Camerons): (feather bonnet only - drummers and drum major) White
 The Highlanders (Seaforth, Gordons and Camerons): (Pipers only) Eagle feather
 Queen's Own Cameron Highlanders: Royal blue
 Queen's Own Cameron Highlanders: (feather bonnet only - drummers and drum major) White
 Queen's Own Cameron Highlanders: (Pipers only) Eagle feather
 Queen's Own Highlanders (Seaforth and Camerons): Royal blue
 Queen's Own Highlanders (Seaforth and Camerons): (feather bonnet only - drummers and drum major) White
 Queen's Own Highlanders (Seaforth and Camerons): (Pipers only) Eagle feather
 Queen's Royal Irish Hussars (pipers on caubeen only): White over red
 Queen's Royal Hussars (pipers on caubeen only): White over red
 Royal Irish Rangers: Green
 Royal Corps of Transport (pipers on feather bonnet only): Red over white over blue
 Royal Ulster Rifles: Black
 Seaforth Highlanders (feather bonnet only - drummers and drum major): White
 Seaforth Highlanders (Pipers only) Black cock feather
 No. 9 Commando and No. 11 (Scottish) Commando: Black

Other armies

Australian Army
There are five Army Reserve Regiments with Highland Companies in the Australian Army which wear the hackle:

 2nd/17th Battalion, The Royal New South Wales Regiment
 41st Battalion, The Royal New South Wales Regiment
 5th/6th Battalion, The Royal Victoria Regiment
 10th/27th Regiment, The Royal South Australia Regiment
 16th Battalion, The Royal Western Australia Regiment

Canadian Army

There are several fusilier regiments in the Canadian Army which wear the hackle (the French-speaking fusilier regiments do not appear to do so):

 The Princess Louise Fusiliers: French grey
 The Royal Highland Fusiliers of Canada: White
 Royal 22e Régiment: Red (not otherwise considered a fusilier regiment, they wear fusilier full dress because of their alliance with the Royal Welch Fusiliers)

Scottish-influenced non-fusilier regiments which wear the hackle include:

 48th Highlanders of Canada (feather bonnet only): White
 The Argyll and Sutherland Highlanders of Canada (Princess Louise's) (drummers on feather bonnet only): White
 The Black Watch (Royal Highland Regiment) of Canada: Red
 The Calgary Highlanders (drummers on feather bonnet only): White 
 The Cameron Highlanders of Ottawa (Duke of Edinburgh's Own): Royal blue
 The Canadian Scottish Regiment (Princess Mary's) (drummers on feather bonnet only): White
 The Essex and Kent Scottish (feather bonnet only): White
 The Lorne Scots (Peel, Dufferin and Halton Regiment): Primrose yellow
 The Queen's Own Cameron Highlanders of Canada: Royal blue (except pipers in full dress, who wear an eagle feather instead).
 The Seaforth Highlanders of Canada (drummers on feather bonnet only): White

Irish-influenced non-fusilier regiments which wear the hackle (on the caubeen):

 2nd Battalion, Irish Regiment of Canada: Green (light blue for senior NCOs and officers)

Dutch Army
A few infantry regiments in the Dutch Army wear the hackle:

 Regiment Stoottroepen Prins Bernhard: Black
 Korps Commandotroepen: Black
 Regiment Limburgse Jagers: Red
 Regiment Infanterie Oranje Gelderland: Red
 Korps Luchtdoelartillerie Black over red

Indian Army
In the Indian Army, a few selected infantry regiments wear the hackle:

 Brigade of the Guards: Red over yellow
 The Grenadiers: White
 Kumaon Regiment: Green
 Mahar Regiment: Dull cherry
 Maratha Light Infantry: Red over green
 Naga Regiment: Orange
 Rajput Regiment: Maroon over red
 National Cadet Corps: Red

Malaysian Army
 Royal Military College: Red (to be worn on Annual Passing Out parade only)
 Royal Ranger Regiment: Black

New Zealand Army
 Canterbury, and Nelson-Marlborough and West Coast Regiment: Green

Pakistan Army
 The Punjab Regiment: Green
 The Sindh Regiment: Red
 Northern Light Infantry: White with ceremonial headgear only
 Cadets at Pakistan Military Academy: Red over green
 9th Battalion, Azad Kashmir Regiment: Red (commemorates the action in the Leepa Valley,  Kashmir in 1972)

Sri Lanka Army
 Sri Lanka Armoured Corps: White and red
 Sri Lanka Light Infantry: White
 Sri Lanka Sinha Regiment: Black, yellow and green
 Gemunu Watch: Red
 Gajaba Regiment: Yellow
 Vijayabahu Infantry Regiment: Maroon, green and yellow
 Mechanized Infantry Regiment: Black and maroon  
 Special Forces Regiment: Black and red
 Military Intelligence Corps: Dark blue, yellow, and dark green  
 Sri Lanka Army Service Corps: Blue, white and yellow 
 Sri Lanka Army Medical Corps: Hackle yellow, blue and dull cherry red
 Sri Lanka Army Ordnance Corps: Red, yellow and blue 
 Sri Lanka Electrical and Mechanical Engineers: Oxford blue, golden yellow and signal red 
 Sri Lanka Army General Service Corps: Blue and saffron 
 Sri Lanka Army Women's Corps: Beach brown 
 Sri Lanka Rifle Corps: Green and yellow
 Sri Lanka Army Pioneer Corps: Green and red
 Sri Lanka National Guard: Red, white and blue

South African Army
Scottish- and Irish-influenced regiments which wear the hackle include:

 South African Irish Regiment: Green
 Transvaal Scottish Regiment: Red
 Witwatersrand Rifles: Black

United States Army
 United States Military Academy: Cadet Officers wear black hackles on their shakos for parades.

References 

Headgear
Military uniforms

fr:Plume#Utilisation ornementale